.cern is a top-level domain for the European Organization for Nuclear Research (CERN). It was registered on 13 August 2014. On 20 October 2015 CERN moved its main Website to https://home.cern.

References

CERN
Generic top-level domains